Henri Dulieux (10 May 1897 – 29 May 1982) was a French fencer. He won a bronze medal in the team épée event at the 1936 Summer Olympics.

References

External links
 

1897 births
1982 deaths
French male épée fencers
Olympic fencers of France
Fencers at the 1936 Summer Olympics
Olympic bronze medalists for France
Olympic medalists in fencing
Sportspeople from Lille
Medalists at the 1936 Summer Olympics
20th-century French people